In Polynesian mythology, Mata Upola or Marangai was the third wind that Maui took control of.  He was the east wind.

References

Polynesian gods
Wind deities